The 2020 Fitzgibbon Cup was the 104th staging of the Fitzgibbon Cup since its establishment by the Gaelic Athletic Association in 1912. It is sponsored by Electric Ireland, and known as the Electric Ireland HE GAA Fitzgibbon Cup for sponsorship purposes. The draw for the group stage fixtures took place on 4 December 2019. The 2020 Fitzgibbon Cup started with the group stage on 12 January 2020 and ended on 12 February 2020.

University College Cork were the defending champions.

On 12 February 2020, University College Cork won the Fitzgibbon Cup after an 0–18 to 2–11 defeat of the Institute of Technology, Carlow in the final.  This was their 40th cup title overall and their second title in succession.

University of Limerick's Cian Darcy was the Fitzgibbon Cup top scorer with 2-45.

Group stage

Group A

Table

Fixtures and results

Group B

Table

Fixtures and results

Group C

Table

Fixtures and results

Group D

Table

Fixtures and results

Knockout stage

Quarter-finals

Semi-finals

Final

Cup statistics

Top scorers

Top scorers overall

Top scorers in a single game

References

External links
 gaa.ie Higher Education Fixtures

Fitzgibbon
Fitzgibbon Cup